Gerdab or Gerd Ab may refer to:
Gerdab-e Olya, Chaharmahal and Bakhtiari
Gerdab-e Sofla, Chaharmahal and Bakhtiari Province
Gerdab-e Piazi, Fars Province
Gerdab, Hormozgan
Gerdab, Isfahan
Gerdab, Kerman
Gerdab, Khuzestan
Gardab-e Yek, Khuzestan Province
Gerdab-e Kebir, Kohgiluyeh and Boyer-Ahmad Province
Gerdab-e Olya, Kohgiluyeh and Boyer-Ahmad
Gerdab-e Saqaveh, Kohgiluyeh and Boyer-Ahmad Province
Gerdab, Lorestan
Gerd Ab, Mazandaran

See also
Gardab (disambiguation)
Gerdab-e Olya (disambiguation)